The Battle of Héricourt was fought on 13 November 1474 near Héricourt, Burgundy, as part of the Burgundian Wars. It resulted in victory for the Swiss Confederacy and its allies over the Burgundian State.

The battle

The Swiss and their allies (Lower League, Austrian cities of Alsace, Swabian imperial cities) set out on their campaign immediately after war was declared on Charles the Bold. One army entered Alsace via Basel and a second via Porrentruy. On 8 November 1474 they besieged Héricourt, which controlled the road from the Sundgau to Burgundy. They were opposed by 12,000 troops (8,000 mounted fighters and 4,000 foot soldiers) under the command of Henri of Neuchâtel and Jacques of Savoy, Count of Romont.

On the 13th November at noon, the Swiss received a report of the approaching reinforcements. With the help of the Habsburg cavalry, they beat the Burgundian cavalry in two battles with little losses. When the decimated troops withdrew, the main power of the allies followed them through the valley of the Lisaine. At the same time, a smaller corps of men from Bern and Lucerne moved through the forested hills and attacked the enemy troops at Chenebier. A final battle occurred at the height of Frahier. When a defeat threatened here, too, the Burgundians fled in all directions. 

Subsequently, on 16 November Héricourt's garrison surrendered and was occupied by Austrian troops. The Burgundians had lost more than three thousand men in these battles, while the Swiss had few losses. The inhabitants of the city were allowed to leave the village and take their belongings with them. The castle was handed over to Duke Sigismund.

The battle was one of the first using hand-held guns.

See also
Battles of the Old Swiss Confederacy

References

1474 in Europe
1470s in the Holy Roman Empire
Battles of the Burgundian Wars
Conflicts in 1474